Robert Earl Campbell (July 23, 1900 – February 11, 1953) was a Canadian professional ice hockey player. Campbell, nicknamed Spiff, played three seasons in the National Hockey League for the Ottawa Senators and New York Americans between 1923 and 1926. Prior to the NHL, he spent three seasons in the Western Canada Hockey League. The rest of his career, which lasted from 1921 to 1929, was spent in various minor leagues.

He was born in Buckingham, Quebec.

Career statistics

Regular season and playoffs

References
Obituary at LostHockey.com

External links
 
 

1900 births
1953 deaths
Canadian ice hockey defencemen
Edmonton Eskimos (ice hockey) players
Hamilton Tigers (CPHL) players
Ice hockey people from Gatineau
Kitchener Flying Dutchmen players
New York Americans players
Ottawa Senators (1917) players
Saskatoon Sheiks players
Stratford Nationals players